The mayor of Taupō officiates over the Taupō District of New Zealand's North Island.

The mayor of Taupō is the head of the municipal government, and presides over the district council. The mayor is directly elected using a first-past-the-post electoral system. The office was established on 1 December 1989, after the formation of the district council in the 1989 local government reforms. David Trewavas is the current mayor of Taupō. He sought reelection in 2019, months after receiving a kidney transplant from his wife.

List of office holders

Mayors
Taupō District has had four mayors. The following is a complete list:

Deputy mayors

References

Taupo
Taupo
Politics of the Bay of Plenty Region
Taupō District
Taupo